

Walhstod (died ) was a medieval Bishop of Hereford, in England.

Walhstod was consecrated between 727 and 731 and died between 731 and 736.

Notes

Citations

References

External links
 

Bishops of Hereford
8th-century English bishops
730s deaths
Year of birth unknown
8th-century English clergy